Telerop 2009 – Es ist noch was zu retten ("Telerop 2009: There is still something to be saved") is a German science fiction television series. It was created under the direction of Eberhard Itzenplitz and Michael Kehlmann and first aired on 10 July 1974 on ARD.

The series portrays a dark future for 2009. As a result of environmental pollution during the 1970s and 1980s the natural environment is largely destroyed. For instance the use of pesticides killed off plants with only insects surviving, smog is a permanent problem, Germany partly turned to a steppe landscape and the share of oxygen in the air fell to 16%. Telerop is a television channel which reports from this disaster zone of Germany.

See also 
 List of German television series

References

External links 
 

1974 German television series debuts
1974 German television series endings
German science fiction television series
German-language television shows
Dystopian television series
Television series set in 2009
Environmental television
Water scarcity in fiction
Das Erste original programming
Television series set in the future